Priscilla Ahn's album This Is Where We Are was released in the US on 15 February 2014. It was released in Japan on 19 July 2013 and later in Korea and Taiwan. All songs on the album were performed by Priscilla Ahn.

Track listing

Tour
Ahn toured Japan, South Korea, and Taiwan in July and August 2013 to support her album.  She toured the US in May 2014.

Reception 
SQE Music released "Diana," the first track from the album, on 11 December 2013, about which Filter Magazine commented "The verses showcase her airy vocals before they harmonize with layers of synths, beats and strings that, together, evoke an ethereal, dreamy sound."

Jacqueline Caruso, writing for The Deli, said that "Diana" "has all the sweetness, euphoria, and mystery of paragliding across a rainbow."

References

External links
Priscilla Ahn official website

2014 albums
Synth-pop albums by American artists
Priscilla Ahn albums